Luis Vicente Otin (born 13 May 1959) is a Spanish former professional racing cyclist. He rode in one edition of the Tour de France and three editions of the Vuelta a España.

References

External links
 

1959 births
Living people
Spanish male cyclists
People from Norte de Aralar
Cyclists from Navarre